Ivo Banac (1 March 1947 – 30 June 2020) was a Croatian-American historian, a professor of European history at Yale University and a politician of the former Liberal Party in Croatia, known as the Great Bard of Croatian historiography. , Banac was a consultant for the Bosnian Institute. He died after a serious illness at age 73.

Biography
Banac was born in Dubrovnik in 1947. In 1959 he emigrated to the United States with his mother, reuniting with his father who had escaped from Yugoslavia in 1947. After his father's death in a traffic accident a year later, Ivo lived with his mother in New York City, where he studied history at Fordham University, graduating in 1969. In the same year Banac moved to California, where he obtained M.Sc. and Ph.D. degrees from the Stanford University. Although he was a member of Students for a Democratic Society, by his own account he was not attracted by the West Coast flower power movement of the late 1960s.

Banac worked at the Stanford University Department of History and Linguistics from 1972 to 1977, and then moved back to the East Coast to teach at Yale University. While at Yale, he earned his tenure, and was a two-time master of Pierson College.His 1984 book The National Question in Yugoslavia: Origins, History, Politics was awarded the Wayne S. Vucinich Prize for the best North American book in the field of Russian and Eastern European studies.  

During his stay in the United States, Banac regularly visited Yugoslavia. While visiting Zagreb in 1971, he met Vlado Gotovac and Franjo Tuđman, who would both become major Croatian political figures after the fall of communism. Banac remained in close contact with Gotovac until his death in   2000; on the other hand, he reportedly didn't think highly of Tuđman, describing him as a person who could not tolerate dissent. Nonetheless, Banac organized Tuđman's lecture at Yale University in 1990.

In 1990, Banac was accepted as an associate member in the Croatian Academy of Sciences and Arts. Between 1994 and 1999 he was the director of the Institute on Southern Europe at the Central European University, Budapest. From 1990 onwards, Ivo Banac was also active in Croatian politics. He joined the Croatian Social Liberal Party (HSLS) and became one of the strongest critics of Franjo Tuđman and his government, especially with regards to policy towards Bosnia and Herzegovina. He expressed his criticism in a column written for Feral Tribune. After the HSLS split in 1997, Banac joined the Liberal Party, keeping a critical distance towards the government even after LS became part of a new governing left-centre coalition in 2000.

He often accused Ivica Račan of the SDP of not doing enough to reverse the negative policies of Tuđman's era. Many were surprised to find Banac, who had a reputation of a maverick and independent intellectual, become the leader of the LS. It was even more surprising to see him take the post of Minister of Environmental Protection in 2003. He held that post for only a few months, until the SDP - the party with whom the LS was aligned - lost the election to a rejuvenated HDZ. 

He was elected to the Croatian Parliament in the 2003 Croatian parliamentary election. After the elections, Banac advocated a merger of all liberal parties in Croatia. This policy was opposed by Zlatko Kramarić who orchestrated Banac's removal from the party leadership in 2004. Banac left the LS in February 2005 and was an independent representative in the Sabor for the rest of his term. He was publicly criticized for having allegedly mishandled public funds, by renting his personal apartment to himself as office space, as well as furnishing it with taxpayers money. Banac replied, to accusations that such actions constitute mishandling of public funds, that while "the data published in the media are correct, it is all a matter of interpretation, is the glass half full or half empty". Between 2007 and 2009, Banac was the President of the Croatian Helsinki Committee.

At Yale, he was the Bradford Durfee Professor of History Emeritus. He also served as the director of the Council on European Studies at Yale University.

In his later years, Banac was accused of historical revisionism. In a 2017 lecture organized by the Roman Catholic Diocese of Požega Banac stated among other things, that the Ustaše movement was based on the tradition of Hajduks and could not be identified with modern fascist movements. Banac also blamed World War II in Yugoslavia on the King Alexander dictatorship and stated that Communism caused much greater damage than fascism.

Selected bibliography

Books
 
 
 
 With Stalin against Tito: Cominformist splits in Yugoslav communism (1988)
 Cijena Bosne [The Price of Bosnia] (1996)
 Raspad Jugoslavije [The Break-up of Yugoslavia] (2001).

Papers

References

External links
 Ivo Banac - Detalji znanstvenika   (Scientist profile at the Ruđer Bošković Institute)

1947 births
2020 deaths
Writers from Dubrovnik
20th-century American historians
Yugoslav emigrants to the United States
Representatives in the modern Croatian Parliament
Historians of the Balkans
Historians of the Holocaust
Historians of communism
Stanford University Department of History faculty
Yale University faculty
Fordham University alumni
Stanford University alumni
Croatian Social Liberal Party politicians
Liberal Party (Croatia) politicians
Government ministers of Croatia
Croatian human rights activists